The 2007 season in Swedish football, starting January 2007 and ending December 2007:

Events

Honours

Official titles

Competitions

Promotions, relegations and qualifications

Promotions

Relegations

International qualifications

Domestic results

Allsvenskan

Superettan

2007 Division 1 Norra

2007 Division 1 Södra

2007 Svenska Cupen 

Final

2007 Supercupen 
Final

National team results

Notes

References 
Print

Online

 
Seasons in Swedish football